Asunder may refer to:

 Asunder (software), a CD-ripping program for Linux and BSD
 Asunder (album), a 2000 album by Heaven Shall Burn, released in 2000